Parnera Hill is situated in Parnera town of Valsad district, Gujarat, India. It is located around 6.5 km away from Valsad city and 200 miles away from Mumbai. It has two entries one from Atul and one from Parnera.

History 

As per known information, a Hindu king had made a fort on the hill. Upon inspection of the Fort's relics and structure use of skillful engineering methods of that time may be seen. The fort was under Dharampur state (called Ram Nagar state at that time) during the 15th century. Sultan Muhammad Shah Begda won this fort at the end of 15th century. In 16th century, portuguese of Daman seized and destroyed this fort in 1558 and 1568. After that, Shivaji raid on Surat in 1664 and 1670. That time, while moving back they had passed through the fort of Parnera Hill. That time, a huge war was happened here. Based on folktale, Shivaji jumped away from a big hidden passage of the fort with his horse during this war.

In 1696, Commander of Shivaji, Shree Moro Pandit took possession of fort and built military base. That time was era of Peshwa. But, Golden era of Peshwa completed slowly. In 1780, Fort come under the hand of Gayakwad government of Vadodara, then Peshwa Balaji Bajirao 3rd attacked on the fort. This fight ran up to 7 days. One poet has mentioned this fight's description in "Parnera ni lol" garba. In 1780, British Govt. took possession of fort under the leadership of Lt. Wales and put military for handling harassment of Pindharas. At the beginning of the 19th century, military was moved away from there. During 1857's rebellion, fort was demolished. Some relics of it still exists on Parnera Hill.

There are three stepwells on Parnera Hill. Army, Commander used water of it during that time.

There are still three cannon in broken fort. There were around 150 cannons in fort during Indian independence. Some of them are now in Valsad R.P.F. Ground.

Temples 

There are three temples on the top of Parnera Hill:

 Shree Maha Kali Mata Temple
 Shree Chandika, Shree Ambika, Shree Navdurga, Shree Sheetla Mata and Hanumanji Temple
 Swayambhu Rameshwar Mahadev Temple

Shree Maha Kali Mata temple is situated on the top of Parnera Hill. In south direction of the fort, there is a big rock where cave is situated in it. Shree Maha Kali Mata statue is inside the cave. There is also one archaeological temple on the hill, where goddesses Shree Chandika, Shree Ambika, Shree Navdurga, Shree Sheetla Mata statues are in the temple. There is also temple of God Hanumanji in front of it. Swayambhu Rameshwar Mahadev temple is also located near this temple on the hill.

Based on one folktale, five goddesses Shree Chandika, Shree Ambika, Shree Navdurga, Shree Sheetla and Shree Kalika was stayed with each other here. Because of some reason, Goddess Kalika became sad. Goddess Kalika was gone to the cave. Therefore, there are two temples on the hill. In every October, a huge fair is organized on Parnera Hill during Navratri.

Mosque 

Chand Pir Baba Dargah is situated on the top of Parnera Hill. Pir was martyred in the fight of truth and non-violence. During fight, Pir's cut head fell down in Parnera and Pir's body fell down in Bilimora.

In remembrance of Pir's sacrifice, Dargah were made in Parnera and Bilimora. Based on one folktale, Pir's body was buried in Pardi's Chand Pir Shah dargah.

References

Hills of Gujarat
Tourist attractions in Valsad district
Forts in Gujarat